Godfrey Shawa is a Malawian politician and the president of the Alliance for Democracy (Malawi), succeeding Dindi Gowa Nyasulu.

See also
Politics of Malawi

References

External links
 Nyasa Times

Alliance for Democracy (Malawi) politicians
21st-century Malawian politicians
Living people
Place of birth missing (living people)
Year of birth missing (living people)